The 1972 United States Senate election in West Virginia took place on November 7, 1972.

Primary elections

Democratic primary

Candidate 
 Jennings Randolph, incumbent U.S. Senator

Results

Republican primary

Candidate 
 Louise Leonard, incumbent State Senator

Results

General election

Results

See also 

 1972 United States Senate elections

References 

West Virginia
1972
1972 West Virginia elections